Aethes alatavica is a species of moth of the family Tortricidae. It is found in Central Asia, Russia, Mongolia and China (Beijing, Inner Mongolia, Ningxia, Qinghai, Shaanxi, Shanxi, Xinjiang).

References

alatavica
Moths described in 1962
Moths of Asia